Georgina Hera Salter  (née Hapuku; 2 December 1950 – 28 November 2018) was a New Zealand netball coach and international netball player.

Biography 
Salter was a member of the national netball team, the Silver Ferns, from 1974 to 1975. She coached the Otago Rebels to win the inaugural Coca-Cola Cup in 1998, and guided Otago to the national provincial title in the same year.

In the 2019 New Year Honours, Salter was appointed a Member of the New Zealand Order of Merit for services to netball. The Queen's approval of the award took effect on 27 November 2018, prior to the date of decease.

References

External links
In Remembrance: Georgina Salter (nee Hapuku) at Netball New Zealand

1950s births
2018 deaths
Members of the New Zealand Order of Merit
New Zealand international netball players
New Zealand netball coaches
New Zealand Māori netball players
Sportspeople from Otago
1975 World Netball Championships players
National Netball League (New Zealand) coaches